Continuity and Change is an international peer-reviewed academic journal published three times per year by Cambridge University Press. The journal was established by Richard Wall and Lloyd Bonfield with the intention of defining the field of historical sociology. It publishes articles concerned with long-term continuities and discontinuities in the structures of past societies, taking their methodology from the traditional fields of history, sociology, law, demography, economics, and anthropology.

Sociology journals
History journals
Publications established in 1986
Cambridge University Press academic journals
English-language journals
Triannual journals
Demography journals